Siegfried Melzig (born 12 July 1940) is a German former football player and manager.

He played as a goalkeeper for SpVgg Weisenau and SV Meppen.

He managed VfL Osnabrück, Bonner SC, Bayer Uerdingen, Panionios, FC 08 Homburg, Freiburger FC, MSV Duisburg, Rot-Weiss Essen, SpVgg Bayreuth and Preußen Münster.

References

1940 births
Living people
Sportspeople from Wrocław
German footballers
Association football goalkeepers
SV Meppen players
German football managers
Panionios F.C. managers
MSV Duisburg managers
TPS Turku football managers
Rot-Weiss Essen managers
KFC Uerdingen 05 managers
2. Bundesliga managers
VfL Osnabrück managers
FC 08 Homburg managers
Bonner SC managers
SC Preußen Münster managers
Freiburger FC managers
German expatriate football managers
Expatriate football managers in Greece
West German expatriate sportspeople in Greece
Expatriate football managers in Finland
German expatriate sportspeople in Finland
West German football managers
West German footballers
Silesian-German people